This was the first edition of the tournament.

Kathinka von Deichmann won the title, defeating Andrea Lázaro García in the final, 3–6, 6–3, 6–2.

Seeds

Draw

Finals

Top half

Bottom half

References

Main Draw

Koper Open - Singles